Raketenjagdpanzer (missile armed tank hunter) is the designation of a range of German dedicated tank destroyers equipped with anti-tank guided missiles. Four different Raketenjagdpanzer have been used so far:

Raketenjagdpanzer 1
Raketenjagdpanzer 2
Raketenjagdpanzer 3 Jaguar 1
Raketenjagdpanzer 4 Jaguar 2

An infantry fighting vehicle with ATGMs for a secondary anti-tank role like a Marder with a MILAN-launcher is not considered a Raketenjagdpanzer.

Tank destroyers of Germany